Pentaamine(nitrogen)ruthenium(II) chloride is an inorganic compound with the formula [Ru(NH3)5(N2)]Cl2. It is a nearly white solid, but its solutions are yellow. The cationic complex is of historic significance as the first compound with N2 bound to a metal center. [Ru(NH3)5(N2)]2+ adopts an octahedral structure with C4v symmetry.

Preparation and properties
Pentaamine(nitrogen)ruthenium(II) chloride is synthesized in an aqueous solution from pentaamminechlororuthenium(III) chloride, sodium azide, and methanesulfonic acid:
[Ru(NH3)5Cl]Cl2 + NaN3 → [Ru(NH3)5N2]Cl2 + ...
If it is to be used in situ, the cation can be made more conveniently from ruthenium(III) chloride and hydrazine hydrate:
RuCl3 + 4 N2H4 → [Ru(NH3)5N2]2+ + ...

This N2 complex is stable in aqueous solution and has a relatively low ligand exchange rate with water. Being a d6 complex, the Ru-N bond is stabilized by the pi backbonding, the donation of metal d-electrons into the N2 π* orbitals.  The related metal ammine complex [Os(NH3)5(N2)]2+ is also known.

Reactions
The dinitrogen ligand is not reduced by aqueous sodium borohydride. Nearly all known reactions of this compound are displacement reactions.  Pentaamine(halogen)ruthenium(II) halides can be synthesized by treating [Ru(NH3)5N2]2+ with halide sources:
[Ru(NH3)5N2]2+ + X− → [Ru(NH3)5X]+ + N2

[Ru(NH3)5N2]2+ forms the symmetrically bridging symmetrical dinitrogen complex [(NH3)5Ru-NN-Ru(NH3)5]4+.

References

Ruthenium complexes
Chlorides
Coordination complexes
Ammine complexes
Ruthenium(II) compounds
Nitrogen compounds